Nesip Ibrahimi was an Albanian politician and mayor of Tirana from 1976 through 1983.

References

Year of birth missing
Year of death missing
Mayors of Tirana